Ann Turnbull (born 1943) is a British writer of fiction for children and young adults. Her work includes a novel, set in a Midlands mining town during the Great Depression of the 1930s which is about a young girl named Mary Dyer, and No Shame, No Fear, a novel for young adults that depicts the persecution of Quakers during the 1660s, and is set in both Shropshire and London and was shortlisted for the Guardian Children's Fiction Prize . 
Pigeon Summer was nominated for the Nestle Smarties Book Prize and No Shame, No Fear was nominated for the Whitbread Book Award. She has written a number of picture books but the best known is The Sand Horse which is illustrated by Michael Foreman.

References

External links

 
 

1943 births
Living people
British children's writers
People from Hertford
British women children's writers
British women novelists
20th-century British women writers
20th-century British novelists
21st-century British women writers
21st-century British novelists